The City of Whitehorse is a local government area in Victoria, Australia in the eastern suburbs of Melbourne.

Whitehorse was formed in December 1994 by the amalgamation of the former cities of Box Hill and Nunawading. The name Whitehorse came from the White Horse Inn, a tavern originally located in the area in the late 19th century. This name was applied to the major thoroughfare, Whitehorse Road, which runs through the municipality today.

In the original proposals for council amalgamations in Melbourne, Whitehorse was a suggested name for an area comprising the City of Box Hill, with the addition of residents east of Union Road (part of the old City of Camberwell). The affected residents were unhappy, believing an alignment with Box Hill would lower the value of their properties. A second proposal featured the current boundaries of Whitehorse. The City of Nunawading proposed the name "City of Koornung", claiming it was more appropriate, as both cities shared the Koonung Creek, but they failed to note they had spelled Koonung incorrectly in their proposal. Another suggestion was "City of Deakin", as the region of Whitehorse contains both the Federal electorate of Deakin, and the Melbourne campus of Deakin University, in Burwood.

Councillors and wards 

Effective from the 2020 local council elections, Whitehorse has eleven single-member wards. The names of the eleven single-member wards are: Cootamundra, Eley, Elgar, Kingsley, Lake, Mahoneys, Simpson, Sparks, Terrara, Walker and Wattle. Councillors are elected every four years to represent their ward. Council elections are conducted by postal voting and votes are counted using instant-runoff voting. Voting is compulsory for residents who are on the electoral roll for state elections, but voters aged 70 years or over are not obliged to vote at local council elections. The mayor is elected by the councillors at the first meeting of the council for a term of one year, at the end of which a council meeting is held to elect the mayor for another fixed term.

The current councillors, elected at the 2020 election, are as follows:

Past councillors 

BYE denotes councillor elected at a by-election. CB denotes councillor elected via count back. 

1. Noel Richard Spurr 2. Helen Buckingham 3. Richard Anderson 4. Sharon Patridge 5. Pauline Richards 6. Tanya Tescher

Townships and localities
The 2021 census, the city had a population of 169,346 up from 162,078 in the 2016 census

^ - Territory divided with another LGA

Major thoroughfares

 Blackburn Road (State Route 13)
 Boronia Road (State Route 36)
 Burwood Highway (State Route 26)
 Canterbury Road (State Route 32)
 Elgar Road (B970)
 Eastern Freeway (M3)
 Highbury Road
 Maroondah Highway (Whitehorse Road) (State Route 34)
 Middleborough Road (State Route 23)
 Mitcham Road (State Route 36)
 Riversdale Road (State Route 20)
 Springvale Road (State Route 40)
 Station Street (State Route 47)
 Surrey Road (State Route 13)
 Warrigal Road (State Route 15)

Culture

Neighbours is filmed in Vermont South; Pin Oak Court is the real cul-de-sac that has doubled for Ramsay Street since 1985. All of the houses featured in the show are real and the residents allow Neighbours to shoot external scenes in their front and back yards and on occasions, in their garages. Owing to its association with the show, Pin Oak Court has become popular with tourists; Tours to the cul-de-sac run throughout the year. The interior scenes are filmed at the Global Television studios in the adjacent suburb of Forest Hill.

Box Hill has variously supported an eponymous brass band since 1889.

Sister city relations

On 12 May 1971, the City of Box Hill established a sister city relationship with Matsudo, in Chiba, Japan. In December 1994, when Box Hill amalgamated with Nunawading, the City of Whitehorse re-affirmed its relationship with Matsudo.

In April 2005, the City of Whitehorse signed a Memorandum of Friendship and Understanding with Shaoxing, in Zhejiang, China. The Memorandum of Friendship and Understanding aims to foster international liaisons and links and facilitate the exchange of information and personal visits, as well as to strengthen economic, tourism and educational connections between the two cities through sharing knowledge and cultural understanding.

Libraries
All libraries in the City of Whitehorse are operated by the Whitehorse Manningham Regional Library Corporation, 
which also has 4 branches in the City of Manningham
 Blackburn Library – Located at Cnr Blackburn and Central Roads, Blackburn.
 Box Hill Library – Located at 1040 Whitehorse Road, Box Hill.
 Nunawading Library – Located at 379 Whitehorse Road, Nunawading.
 Vermont South Library – Located at Pavey Place, Vermont South.

See also
 List of places on the Victorian Heritage Register in the City of Whitehorse

References

External links
 
Official website
Public Transport Victoria local public transport map
Link to Land Victoria interactive maps

Local government areas of Melbourne
Greater Melbourne (region)
 
1994 establishments in Australia
Populated places established in 1994